Bidbid is a town in the region Ad Dakhiliyah, in northeastern Oman.

Climate

See also
 List of cities in Oman

Populated places in Oman
Ad Dakhiliyah Governorate